Biyer Phul is a Bangladeshi romantic movie.  It was released 1999 and directed by Motin Rahman. The film stars Riaz, Shabnur, and Shakil Khan in lead roles along with Kabori, Amol Bose, Prabir Mitra, Ahmed Sharif, and Misha Sawdagor. The movie was inspired from the Hindi movie Deewana

Cast 
 Riaz – Sagor
 Shakil Khan – Akash
 Shabnur – Nadi
 Kabori – Dilruba
 Amol Bose – Kashem Mallik
 Prabir Mitra – Ashrafi
 Ahmed Sharif – Aslam Chowdhury
 Misha Sawdagor – Didar

Music 
Ahmed Imtiaz Bulbul was music director for the film.

Soundtrack

See also

 Soshur Bari Zindabad
 Rani Kuthir Baki Itihash

References

External links
 

1999 films
1999 romantic drama films
Bengali-language Bangladeshi films
Bangladeshi romantic drama films
Films scored by Ahmed Imtiaz Bulbul
1990s Bengali-language films
Films directed by Motin Rahman
Bangladeshi remakes of Indian films